V is the sixth studio album by the band Live, released in 2001. It featured the singles "Simple Creed" and "Overcome", the latter of which received significant exposure following the September 11 attacks.

History
The collection of songs that became V was never intended to be released as an album. Guitarist Chad Taylor said, "The goal was to prepare songs for the next studio session. MCA got a hold of the material and pushed us to call it an album." The songs were originally going to be released free to fans as a collection called Ecstatic Fanatic. The tracks included two songs featured in films released prior to the release of V, "Forever May Not Be Long Enough", written for the closing credits of The Mummy Returns, and "Deep Enough", which appears in the opening of The Fast and the Furious because director Rob Cohen was a fan of Live. Taylor would later express dismay at the label's disinterest in promoting those two songs, particularly in light of the box office success of both films. V only reached number 22 on the album chart in the US and failed to attain gold status, despite reasonably positive reviews.

Track listing

Personnel
Live
Ed Kowalczyk – lead vocals, rhythm guitar
Chad Taylor – lead guitar, backing vocals
Patrick Dahlheimer – bass 
Chad Gracey – drums

Additional personnel
Adam Duritz – backing vocals on "Flow"
Alain Johannes – "Intro" concept, sitar on "The Ride"
Adam Kowalczyk – rhythm guitar, backing vocals
Michael "Railo" Railton – keyboards, backing vocals
Natasha Schneider – backing vocals on "People Like You"
Tricky – vocals on "Simple Creed"
Shawn Williams – bass on "Flow"

Charts

Weekly charts

Year-end charts

Singles

A: "Simple Creed" did not chart on the Flemish Ultratop 50, but peaked at number 4 on the Ultratip chart.
B: "Forever May Not Be Long Enough" did not chart on the Flemish Ultratop 50, but peaked at number 18 on the Ultratip chart.

Certifications

References

External links
 

2001 albums
Live (band) albums
Albums produced by Alain Johannes
Radioactive Records albums